Gymnocerina cratosomoides is a species of beetle in the family Cerambycidae, and the only species in the genus Gymnocerina. It was described by Bates in 1862.

References

Anisocerini
Beetles described in 1862
Monotypic Cerambycidae genera